Empire Coleridge was a  tanker which was built in 1942 by Sir J Laing & Sons Ltd, Sunderland for the  Ministry of War Transport (MoWT). In 1946 she was sold into merchant service and renamed Esso Cheyenne. She was scrapped in 1961.

Description
The ship was built by Sir J Laing & Sons Ltd, Sunderland. She was launched on 17 March 1942 and completed in May 1942.

She had a GRT of 9,793 and a NRT of 5,772.

The engine was built by North East Marine Engine Co (1938) Ltd, Newcastle upon Tyne.

History
Empire Coleridge was built for the MoWT. She was placed under the management of the Anglo-American Oil Co Ltd. Her port of registry was Sunderland. The Code Letters BDXQ and United Kingdom Official Number 169020 were allocated.

Empire Coleridge was a member of a number of convoys during the Second World War.

HX 239
Convoy HX 239 departed New York on 13 May 1943 and arrived at Liverpool on 28 May. Empire Coleridge was bound for Avonmouth, Somerset. Empire Coleridge was equipped with anti-torpedo nets. She was praised by the Convoy Commodore for her exceptional behaviour while a member of the convoy.

HX 254
Convoy HX 254 departed New York on 27 August 1943 and arrived at Liverpool on 12 September. Empire Coleridge was bound for Thameshaven, Thurrock.

In 1946, Empire Coleridge was sold to the Anglo-American Oil Co Ltd, London. She was renamed Esso Cheyenne. She served until 1961, arriving on 15 April at Boom, Belgium for scrapping.

References

External links
Website with photos of Esso Cheyenne

1942 ships
Ships built on the River Tees
Tankers of the United Kingdom
Steamships of the United Kingdom
Ministry of War Transport ships
Empire ships
World War II tankers
Merchant ships of the United Kingdom